WinWinD was a wind turbine manufacturer headquartered in Espoo, Finland. It manufactured and supplied wind turbines with capacity of 1 and 3 MW.

The company was founded in 2000 in Oulu. In 2006, Chinnakannan Sivasankaran's Siva Group of India acquired majority control in WinWinD. In September 2008, the Abu Dhabi Future Energy Company (Masdar) invested €120million in WinWinD acquiring 40% stake of the company.  In addition to Siva and Masdar, the Finnish investment fund Suomen Teollisuussijoitus (Finnish Industry Investment) has a stake in WinWinD.

The 3MW wind turbine has a innovative and compact medium speed drive train. The nacelle design is similar to Multibrid 5MW wind turbine by aerodyn Energiesysteme GmbH.

WinWinD has assembly factories in Hamina, Finland, and Chennai, India.  It employs more than 800 people globally. In addition to Finland, WinWinD turbines produce energy in Sweden, Estonia, France, Portugal, the Czech Republic and India.

Hamina factory

WinWinD started up a 3 MW wind turbine manufacturing facility at Port of Hamina in 2009.

Vengal factory
WinWinD's 1 MW turbines and blades are manufactured at Vengal, India since September 2009.

Turbines
WWD-1 (1 MW wind turbine)
WWD-3 (3 MW wind turbine)
WinWinD3 (3 MW wind turbine)

See also
List of Offshore Wind Farms
List of wind turbine manufacturers
Renewable energy industry
Wind Power

References

Defunct wind turbine manufacturers
Electric power companies of Finland
Companies established in 2000